Before the Fire Comes Down is the second album by the progressive bluegrass band Northern Lights.

Track listing

Personnel
 Taylor Armerding – mandolin, vocals
 Bob Emery – bass, vocals
 Bill Henry – vocals, guitar
 Alison Brown – banjo

References

External links

1983 albums
Northern Lights (bluegrass band) albums